Plath is a German surname. Notable people with the surname include:

 Aurelia Plath (1907–1994), mother of Sylvia Plath
 John Plath (born 1969), Australian rugby league footballer
 Otto Plath (1885–1940), father of Sylvia Plath and entomologist
 Sylvia Plath (1932–1963), American poet, novelist, short story writer, essayist
Sylvia Plath effect
 Werner Plath (1918–1945), German swimmer
 Wolfgang Plath (1930–1995), German musicologist

See also
Plath GmbH, a German defence supplier
Platt (disambiguation)

German-language surnames